Peter Russell Corrigan  (6 May 1941 – 1 December 2016) was an Australian architect and was involved in the completion of works in stage and set design.

Early life and achievements
Corrigan was educated at Christian Brothers College, St Kilda and then completed his degree in architecture, in 1966 at Melbourne University. He further pursued his studies at Yale University in 1969 under Robert Venturi, completing a master's degree in Environmental Design. Having worked for Philip Johnson, Paul Rudolf, César Pelli and Kevin Roche in New Haven, he returned to Australia in 1974 where he formed his practice, Edmond and Corrigan, a partnership with his wife, Maggie Edmond, initiated in 1975. As a part of Edmond and Corrigan, they won 35 RAIA state awards and four Natural Architectural Design awards.

He obtained his honorary Doctor of Architecture in 1989, for his contribution to Australian Architectural theory and design. Further Adjunct Professor in 1989, at Royal Melbourne Institute of Technology (RMIT).

Having studied at RMIT, Corrigan was a Professor of Architecture at RMIT University and taught architectural design and history for over 30 years. He marked his name as an internationally renowned architect, theatre designer, author and academic, based in Melbourne. He completed costume set design for numerous productions in Australia including "Hoopla Productions, Opera Australia, the Australian Performing Group, Melbourne Theatre Company, Last Laugh Theatre Restaurant, Playbox Theatre, Anthill, Going Through Stages, Nightshift, VSO, SATC, Queensland Lyric, Gligil Theatre Company (Theatre of Principle), Belvoir Street Theatre, STC and The Bell Shakespeare Company".

He had an enduring interest in architectural history and culture and collected an internationally significant large private library of architectural books, including many rare works on drawing and design. Corrigan's extensive collection of books and periodicals related to architecture and design was left to RMIT University Library after his death.

In 1983–84 Corrigan was a guest professor at Graduate School of Design Harvard University, Boston, Massachusetts, and in 1991 he was a guest lecturer at the Polytechnic University of Turin, Italy. In the same year he was promoted at the Third Belgrade Triennial of World Architecture exhibition in Galerija Kulturmog Centra Beograda "39 prominent architects of the world". Likewise the work of Edmond and Corrigan has been exhibited internationally in 1991, 1999 and 2002 at the Venice Biennale of Architecture.

An exhibition of Corrigan's life work was held at RMIT Gallery in 2013 entitled Cities of Hope. It traced the "creative focus of this remarkable Australian architect, bringing to life many of his designs over four decades including architectural models and drawings by Edmond and Corrigan; set and costume designs for theatre; artworks, records and notations from his personal collection and key works selected from public collections which have enriched his practice".  This material has since been donated to the RMIT Design Archives and RMIT Library respectively.

Key projects
Since returning to Australia and commencing his practice Corrigan's work and styles have developed over the years.

The Chapel of St Josephs is located in 27–29 Strabane Avenues, Box Hill. It is located in the middle of the site with an inflected curve plan, with a long curved ramp from the street provides access to the building. The car park is located at the back of the building which gives enough space to view the building in a full circle, as one drives through.

The chapel is a postmodern, three-dimensional solid brick building, with a flat-roofed canopy that is the most significant feature of the building. The use of red and cream brick creates subtle highlighted architectural effects not only on front façade, but also within its surrounds. The timber framed rectangular north-east facing windows, with the identical sized windows to the right of the curvy wall, brings about a dynamic contrast to the mostly curved shaped building. The chapel won the RAIA (Victorian Chapter) inaugural 25 Year Award.

The RMIT Building 8 built in 1993, is one of Corrigan's most recognised buildings, and "combines the bold vision and whimsical style that is Corrigan’s trademark". It is located in Swanston street Melbourne at the University of RMIT. The building creates characteristics of its own along with its structure, several colours and situated materials.
Built on a budget with tough constraints, the designing of building 8 needed to accommodate buildings below and next door as it is currently sitting on top of John Andrew’s unfinished union building. Following the construction of Building 8 it was found necessary to include a "new lift and service core" to allow access to the upper floors. In addition to this "the deep floor plate" was also maximised allowing further developed for rooms located on the upper floors. Detail within the interior such as "balustrades and hand railing" have been positioned in a way giving the building a unique yet chaotic sentiment.
Noticeable along the streetscape of Swanston street, Building 8's roof gives the building part of its individuality. The positioning of the multiple roof structures, form and materiality make this building unique. The building structure also provides examples of many different uses of materials for different areas, some of which include "coloured stone facades, steel pipe strut supports and a polychrome and polygon brick" shown within parts of the building, all of which affect RMIT's atmosphere.

                                                              
The Readings Book Shop is a heritage listed post office founded in 1910, and renovated to be a bookshop and completed in 2005. It is located on 253 Bay St, Port Melbourne, Victoria, 3207. It's a mezzanine in one hand and a freestanding form in the middle of the room on the other. With the sharp angles and its flat surfaces, it filled the bookshop. Surrounding the room are bookshelves up to the first floor. This is an open space without walls.

List of projects
 Edmond & Corrigan 
Church of the Resurrection: Keysborough, 1976. RAIA Victoria State chapter housing merit award, 1981
Freedom Club Child-care Centre: Keysborough, 1977
Kew house, 1982. RAIA Victoria State chapter housing merit award
46 Little Latrobe Street: the office of Edmond & Corrigan: Melbourne, 1986
Athan House, Monbulk, Vic., 1986–88
RMIT Building 8, 1993
Ringwood plaza, 1994, RAIA Victoria State chapter award 1995: new institutional public buildings and award for urban design
Exhibition centre, showground stage-1', 1997, RAIA Victoria State chapter award of merit 1997
Lehrer residence, RAIA Victoria State chapter award of merit 2000
Niagara Galleries, Richmond, Victoria, 2001, Colorbond Steel Award 2002
Academic Centre, Newman College and St Mary's College, 2002
Victorian College of the Art- school of Drama, 2004, in association with Castles Stephenson+ Turner
Lux house alteration: front porch, 2005
Readings bookshop, 2005

References

Further reading

External links

 Peter Corrigan's webpage at RMIT University
 Peter Corrigan CV
 Ringwood Library
 Guide to the Papers of Peter Corrigan UNSW collection: details Corrigan's work with the Australian Performing Group and many other theatre companies.
 Edmond and Corrigan Collection held at RMIT Design Archives
 Peter Corrigan Collection held at RMIT Libraries
Treasures of the Corrigan Collection Peter Corrigan's extensive collection of books and periodicals related to architecture and design was left to RMIT University Library after his death. This brief report gives context to who Corrigan was and features highlights from the collection..

1941 births
2016 deaths
University of Melbourne alumni
Yale School of Architecture alumni
Academic staff of RMIT University
Architects from Melbourne
Recipients of the Royal Australian Institute of Architects’ Gold Medal
Members of the Order of Australia
People from Daylesford, Victoria
People educated at St Mary's College, Melbourne